Max Looff (2 May 1874 – 20 September 1954) was a naval officer of the Imperial German Navy, who reached the rank of Vizeadmiral and later a military writer.

Early career

Looff was born on 2 May 1874 in Strasbourg. He was subsequently transferred to the Naval Academy in Kiel, where he finished his training on 11 April 1892 and was promoted to the rank Seekadett on the same date.

World War I

Looff was appointed in command of Königsberg on 1 April 1914 and remained in command until the ship was scuttled in the Rufiji Delta in July 1915 after protracted artillery exchanges with British monitors. He later joined Paul von Lettow-Vorbeck in his guerilla campaign, and after the Battle of Mahiwa, was put in command of the German wounded and surrendered to the British when instructed to do so.

Later life

Max Looff was recalled to the Kriegsmarine service with the rank of Vizeadmiral on 24 May 1939, but remained in the reserve status for the duration of the War. Looff continued in his work and published the book about the combats in German East Africa, "Tufani" in 1941.

After the end of World War II, Looff remained in the Soviet occupation zone of the Berlin and thus his published work had been placed on the list of forbidden literature by the Communist regime.

Vizeadmiral Max Looff died on 20 September 1954 in Berlin, East Germany aged 80 years.

Military decorations

 Prussian Order of the Red Eagle 4th Class
 Prussian Order of the Crown 4th Class
 Prussian Centenary Medal
 Prussian Lifesaving Medal
 Prussian Service Cross
 Prussian Iron Cross (1914) 1st and 2nd Class
 Hanseatic Cross of Hamburg
 Colonial Medal
 China Medal with Clasps for Yaku, Peitang-Forts and Liang-Hsiang-Hsien
 The Honour Cross of the World War 1914/1918
 Iron Cross First and Second class

References

1874 births
1954 deaths
Military personnel from Strasbourg
People from East Berlin
Imperial German Navy personnel of World War I
German male non-fiction writers
German military writers
Vice admirals of the Reichsmarine
Vice admirals of the Kriegsmarine
Colonial people of German East Africa
Recipients of the Iron Cross (1914), 1st class